Thomas or Tom Skinner may refer to:

Politicians
Thomas Skinner (died c. 1411), MP for Shrewsbury
Thomas Skinner (Lord Mayor of London, 1596), clothworker, Alderman, and Lord Mayor of London
Thomas Skinner (Lord Mayor of London, 1794), Lord Mayor of London
Thomas Gregory Skinner (1842–1907), US Representative from North Carolina

Other people
Thomas Skinner (historical writer) or Skynner (c. 1629–1679), Colchester physician and historical writer
Thomas Skinner (British Army officer, born 1759) (1759–1818), military engineer
Thomas Skinner (British Army officer, died 1843) (c. 1800–1843), soldier and author
Thomas Skinner (British Army officer, born 1804) (1804–1877), commissioner of public works in Ceylon
Thomas Skinner (etcher) (1819–1881), English etcher, inventor, and amateur oil-painter
Thomas Skiner (governor), Hudson's Bay Company governor (1914–1915)
Tom Skinner (1909–1991), New Zealand trade unionist
Thomas Skinner (sailor) (fl. 1920s), British Olympian
Thomas Skinner, plaintiff in Skinner's Case
Thomas Skinner (television executive)
Thomas Edward Barnes Skinner, Postmaster General of Ceylon
Thomas Skinner (businessman)